Nathaniel Taylor (born August 19, 1969 in Boston, Massachusetts) is a sculptor and professional fabricator. He was a host on the Discovery Channel's Smash Lab. He graduated from the Northwest School of Woodenboat Building, Port Townsend, Washington, and the California College of the Arts (formerly California College of Arts and Crafts). Taylor has taught at The Crucible (arts education center), the University of California, Berkeley and the California College of the Arts, teaching classes in kinetic art, and new media. Also a lead artist on the Raygun Gothic Rocket.

References

1969 births
Living people
20th-century American sculptors
21st-century American sculptors
Artists from Boston
Sculptors from Massachusetts